Stélvio Rosa da Cruz (born 24 January 1989), known simply as Stélvio, is an Angolan professional footballer who plays for Luxembourg club FC Mondercange as a defensive midfielder.

Club career
Stélvio was born in Luanda. A product of S.C. Braga's youth academy, he made his Portuguese Primeira Liga debut on 11 November 2007, coming on as a 60th-minute substitute in a 3–0 home win against Sporting CP.

On 4 July 2009, after two seasons in the first team with intermittent use, Stélvio was loaned to U.D. Leiria (recently returned to the top division) in a season-long loan. However, in late January 2010, he moved to his homeland and signed for C.D. Primeiro de Agosto, also on loan.

Stélvio was released by Braga on 31 August 2011. He then joined C.R. Caála, returning to the Angolan Girabola.

In July 2019, after six years in the Luxembourg National Division at the service of F91 Dudelange where he won several team honours, the 30-year-old Stélvio moved to Belgium with R.E. Virton on a one-year contract.

International career
Stélvio represented Portugal at under-21 level. He switched allegiance to his native Angola in 2009, being part of the squad that appeared in the following year's Africa Cup of Nations.

In October 2018, after an absence of eight years, Stélvio was recalled to the national team ahead of a 2019 Africa Cup of Nations qualifier against Mauritania. He was selected for the squad that reached the finals in Egypt by manager Srđan Vasiljević.

References

External links

1989 births
Living people
Angolan emigrants to Portugal
Portuguese sportspeople of Angolan descent
Footballers from Luanda
Angolan footballers
Portuguese footballers
Association football midfielders
Primeira Liga players
S.C. Braga players
U.D. Leiria players
Girabola players
C.D. Primeiro de Agosto players
C.R.D. Libolo players
C.R. Caála players
Cypriot First Division players
Alki Larnaca FC players
Luxembourg National Division players
F91 Dudelange players
Jeunesse Esch players
Challenger Pro League players
R.E. Virton players
RWDM47 players
Portugal youth international footballers
Portugal under-21 international footballers
Angola international footballers
2010 Africa Cup of Nations players
2019 Africa Cup of Nations players
Angolan expatriate footballers
Expatriate footballers in Cyprus
Expatriate footballers in Luxembourg
Expatriate footballers in Belgium
Angolan expatriate sportspeople in Cyprus
Angolan expatriate sportspeople in Belgium